Douglas or Doug McLean may refer to:

Douglas McLean (rower) (1863–1901), also Somerset cricketer
Doug McLean, Sr. (1880–1947), Australian rugby union and rugby league player
Doug McLean, Jr. (1912–1961), Australian rugby union and rugby league player, son of Doug McLean, Sr.

See also
Douglas MacLean, American actor
Doug MacLean, Canadian sportscaster